Mauricio Castaneda Mendoza (born 24 March 1992 in León, Guanajuato, México) is a professional Mexican footballer who currently plays for Murciélagos.

External links
Profile at ascensomx.net

1992 births
Living people
Mexican footballers
Association football forwards
Club León footballers
Mineros de Zacatecas players
Leones Negros UdeG footballers
Tlaxcala F.C. players
Murciélagos FC footballers
Cruz Azul Hidalgo footballers
Liga MX players
Ascenso MX players
Liga Premier de México players
Tercera División de México players
Mexican expatriate footballers
Expatriate footballers in Nicaragua
Footballers from Guanajuato
Sportspeople from León, Guanajuato